Mior Ahmad Fuad bin Mior Badri (22 December 1966 – 2 April 2010), better known by his stage name Din Beramboi, was a Malaysian comedian, actor and radio DJ and was widely known as a talented impersonator and stand-up comic who was very apt at improvisation. His memorable characters include Pak Rahim in the comedy series Afi dan Abah and the puppet Kicap in the talk show Tom Tom Bak, both shown on Astro Ceria. He also frequently collaborated with Afdlin Shauki, having appearances in some of the latter's films such as Buli (2004) and Baik Punya Cilok (2005). Din ventured into radio broadcasting in 2008, pairing with Aznil Haji Nawawi on Riuh Pagi, the daily weekday breakfast show on radio station Era FM.

His stage name "Din Beramboi" was originally used for two fictional characters back in 1990: one created by himself and another created by cartoonist Ibrahim Anon for the magazine Ujang, which became a plagiarism controversy during the mid-1990s.

Din died on 2 April 2010, after suffering from haemorrhagic dengue fever. He was buried at the Taman Ehsan Muslim cemetery in Kepong.

Biography
Din Beramboi was born as Mior Ahmad Fuad bin Mior Badri on 22 December 1966 to his parents Mior Badri Mior Idris and Rahmah Abdullah Sani. He received his early education in Setapak and latter attended Setapak Elementary School.

Personal life
Din Beramboi is a third son from four siblings, and the only son to his family. He married with Suhaini Che Man, and blessed with three children Nil Aina Adibah, Meor Shafiq Ar-Ridhwan, and Nir Ain Syuhada.

Illness and death
On 30 March 2010, Din was admitted to the Intensive Care Unit (ICU) of the Kuala Lumpur Hospital, complaing an extremely fever. Early reports said he was diagnosed with deadly leptospirosis. The following day, he was diagnosed with dengue shock syndrome which causes failure of his liver and kidney. During his spent in the hospital, Din visited by family members, friends and colleagues.

On 2 April 2010, Din died at the Selayang Hospital at 12:30am, according to his brother-in-law, Sharifuddin Che Man who announced his death said: "He (Din) began critical at 11.30 pm after he was given a first CPR until the last CPR at 12.15 in the midnight just now… until the doctor said Din couldn't be saved." Din's sister, Rozana Mior Badri, said that the life support machines installed since he was unconscious stopped following the doctor's advice due to his internal organ failure.

He was laid to rest at the Taman Ehsan Muslim Cemetery at 10:40am.

Filmography

Film

Television series

Telemovie

Television

Discography

Album

References

External links
 
 Din Beramboi's Facebook fan page
 Filemkita.com (a database for trivia on Malaysian movies)
 Era FM's Din Beramboi fans' tribute site

1966 births
2010 deaths
People from Selangor
Malaysian male actors
Malaysian comedians
Malaysian people of Malay descent
Malaysian Muslims
Deaths from dengue fever